The 1996 Bradford Bulls season was the 90th in the club's history. Coached by Brian Smith and captained by Robbie Paul the newly branded Bradford Bulls competed in Super League I. The Bulls finished the regular season in 3rd place and made the semi final, losing 36-42 to Wigan Warriors. The Bulls also competed in the 1996 Challenge Cup, reaching the final which they lost 32-40 to St. Helens.

Season review

February 1996

The 1996 season started off well for the Bradford Northern club newly re-branded as the Bradford Bulls. In their first competitive match they defeated Batley 60–18 in the 4th Round of the 1996 Challenge Cup. Australian import Jeremy Donougher scored the club's first try under the Bulls brand. Bradford's form in the Cup continued after beating Division 1 side Leigh 44–12 at Hilton Park. The Bulls success continued as they hosted Wakefield Trinity in the quarter-finals, however after a brief scare Bradford managed to overcome Wakefield and win 30–18.

March 1996

March started off with a great performance in the Challenge Cup semi-final against arch-rivals Leeds, the Bulls played some brilliant rugby to ensure a 28–6 win earning them a place in the 1996 Challenge Cup Final. Bradford also kicked off the brand new Super League I with a 30–18 win over Castleford Tigers in front of a 10,027 crowd.

April 1996

A trip to Sheffield Eagles was on the cards for the Bulls first away trip of the Super League season, however the Eagles were just too powerful for Bradford and the Bulls were soundly beaten 24–40. However April got a little brighter as the Bulls bounced back to beat London 31–24 to take them up to 5th in the league table. The Bulls were brought back down to earth after their win against London as St. Helens beat Bradford 26–20 at Knowsley Road. Bradford suffered back to back defeats for the first time this season, losing 22–6 to Wigan. Bradford narrowly lost in the 1996 Challenge Cup Final against St. Helens, Bradford went 26–12 at one point but Saints halfback Bobbie Goulding peppered the Bradford fullback Nathan Graham with bombs which turned out to be fruitful for the Saints who scored 3 tries of Goulding's kicks to win the match 40–32 leaving the Bradford players and fans feeling dejected.

May 1996

Bradford started off May in good form after losing the Challenge Cup Final by beating Warrington 36–14 at Odsal Stadium, the Bulls then travelled to Oldham and beat Oldham Bears 30–10. This would be Bradford's first back to back win of the season. The Bulls then beat Paris St Germain 60–32 at home before destroying arch rivals Leeds 54–8 in Round 9. These wins took the Bulls to four games unbeaten and unbeaten for the whole of May.

June 1996

The Bulls started June with a massive 52–4 win over bottom of the league Workington, Bradford ran in 10 tries in this emphatic win. Bradford carried on their form at Thrum Hall where they scraped a win at local rivals Halifax Blue Sox in a hard-fought 22–20 contest. Bradford's 6 game unbeaten run was put to an end by a great performance by Castleford Tigers led by their talisman Frano Botica, the Tigers clinched the game 26–23. However the Bulls responded the following week by destroying the Sheffield Eagles 64–22 at Odsal. The Bulls followed up this win with a hard fought 22–16 win over London Broncos.

July 1996

Bradford beat St. Helens in an excellent display of rugby league, they took the Saints apart and won 50–22 to exact revenge for their Challenge Cup Final defeat. The Bulls excellent form continued as they battled Wigan at Odsal Stadium and the Yorkshire club came up with a 20–12 win. Their 5th consecutive win came at Wilderspool Stadium where they took on Warrington and came away with the spoils beating Warrington 30–20. The Bulls dished out another thumping however this one wasn't as impressive as it was against Oldham Bears, they did keep Oldham to zero points though as Bradford were 56–0 victors.

August 1996

August started off well for Bradford as they demolished arch-rivals Leeds 56–18 with the mercurial Robbie Paul grabbing his 3rd hat-trick of the season. The Bulls extended their winning streak to eight games when they beat bottom of the league Workington 28–14 in a hard fought contest. Local team Halifax Blue Sox put an end to the Bulls' winning streak as Bradford succumbed to a 27–26 defeat in the final home game of the season. The last regular season game came in Paris where the Bulls beat Paris St Germain 27–14 which meant they finished 3rd in the league, 5 points behind Wigan and 6 points behind league leaders St. Helens. This meant that the Bulls had to travel to Central Park to play Wigan in the Premiership Trophy Semi-final, in what was his last game in a Wigan shirt Shaun Edwards scored 4 tries to end Bradford's hopes of a Premiership final appearance in a hard fought 42–36 Wigan win.

Milestones

CCR4: Bradford Bulls win their first competitive game after re-branding. 
CCR4: Jeremy Donougher scored the Bulls first try under the re-branded club.
CCR4: Jeremy Donougher, Sonny Nickle, Davide Longo, Gary Christie, Paul Cook, Karl Fairbank, Carlos Hassan, Paul Loughlin and Paul Medley all scored their 1st tries for the Bulls.
CCR4: Davide Longo scored his 1st hat-trick for the Bulls.
CCR4: Paul Cook kicked his 1st goal for the Bulls.
CCR5: Jon Scales and Simon Knox scored their 1st tries for the Bulls.
CCQF: Graeme Bradley and Jason Donohue scored their 1st tries for the Bulls.
CCSF: Jon Scales scored his 1st hat-trick for the Bulls.
CCSF: Matt Calland scored his 1st try for the Bulls.
Round 1: Jeremy Donougher scored his 1st hat-trick for the Bulls.
Round 1: Robbie Paul scored his 1st try for the Bulls.
Round 1: Paul Loughlin kicked his 1st goal for the club.
Round 2: James Lowes scored his 1st try for the Bulls.
Round 3: Bernard Dwyer scored his 1st try for the Bulls.
Round 3: Paul Cook kicked his 1st drop-goal for the Bulls.
Round 4: Matt Calland scored his 1st hat-trick for the Bulls.
Round 4: Steve McNamara kicked his 1st goal for the Bulls.
CC Final: Robbie Paul scored the 1st ever hat-trick in a cup final and scored his 1st hat-trick for the Bulls.
Round 7: Brian McDermott scored his 1st try for the Bulls.
Round 8: Glen Tomlinson scored his 1st try for the Bulls.
Round 9: Stuart Spruce and Steve McNamara scored their 1st tries for the Bulls.
Round 10: Paul Cook reached 100 points for the Bulls becoming the first player to do so under the new brand.
Round 10: Joe Tamani scored his 1st try for the Bulls.
Round 12: Steve McNamara kicked his 1st drop-goal for the Bulls.
Round 18: Robbie Paul scored his 2nd hat-trick for the Bulls.
Round 19: Robbie Paul scored his 3rd hat-trick for the Bulls.
Premiership Trophy Semi-final: Graeme Bradley scored his 1st hat-trick for the Bulls.

Table

Fixtures

Super League I

Challenge Cup

Squad
Statistics include appearances and points in the Super League, Challenge Cup and Premiership Trophy.

Transfers

In

Out

References

External links
Bradford Bulls Website
Bradford Bulls in T&A
Bradford Bulls on Sky Sports
Bradford on Super League Site
Red,Black And Amber
BBC Sport-Rugby League 

Bradford Bulls seasons
Bradford Bulls